The 1989 NCAA Division II men's basketball tournament involved 32 schools playing in a single-elimination tournament to determine the national champion of men's NCAA Division II college basketball as a culmination of the 1988–89 NCAA Division II men's basketball season. It was won by North Carolina Central University, with North Carolina Central's Miles Clark named the Most Outstanding Player.

This was the first Division II men's tournament to adopt the current Elite Eight format, in which all eight regional winners advance to the championship site.

Regional participants

*denotes tie

Regionals

New England - Waltham, Massachusetts
Location: Dana Center Host: Bentley College

Third Place - Bentley 129, Stonehill 118

South Atlantic - Norfolk, Virginia
Location: Joseph G. Echols Memorial Hall Host: Norfolk State University

Third Place - Alabama A&M 93, Norfolk State 80

Great Lakes - Owensboro, Kentucky
Location: Owensboro Sportscenter Host: Kentucky Wesleyan College

Third Place - SIU Edwardsville 102, Ferris State 92

South - Jacksonville, Alabama
Location: Pete Mathews Coliseum Host: Jacksonville State University

Third Place - Florida Southern 85, Florida Tech 75

North Central - Greeley, Colorado
Location: Butler-Hancock Sports Pavilion Host: University of Northern Colorado

Third Place - Augustana (SD) 112, Alaska–Fairbanks 107**

South Central - Cape Girardeau, Missouri
Location: Show Me Center Host: Southeast Missouri State University

Third Place - Angelo State 89, NW Missouri State 80

East - Millersville, Pennsylvania
Location: Pucillo Gymnasium Host: Millersville University of Pennsylvania

Third Place - Lock Haven 82, Philadelphia U 78

West - Bakersfield, California
Location: CSUB Student Activities Center Host: California State University, Bakersfield

Third Place - Cal State Dominguez Hills 98, Sonoma State 77

*denotes each overtime played

Elite Eight - Springfield, Massachusetts
Location: Springfield Civic Center Hosts: American International College and Springfield College

Third Place - UC Riverside 90, Jacksonville State 81
*denotes each overtime played

All-tournament team
 Miles Clarke (North Carolina Central)
 Maurice Pullum (UC Riverside)
 Antoine Sifford (North Carolina Central)
 Dominique Stevens (North Carolina Central)
 Earnest Taylor (Southeast Missouri State)

References
 1989 NCAA Division II men's basketball tournament jonfmorse.com

External links
 NCAA record book

NCAA Division II men's basketball tournament
Tournament
NCAA Division II basketball tournament
NCAA Division II basketball tournament